Monroe Center is an unincorporated community located in the town of Monroe, Adams County, Wisconsin, United States.

References

Unincorporated communities in Adams County, Wisconsin
Unincorporated communities in Wisconsin